The ARoS Aarhus Kunstmuseum is an art museum in Aarhus, Denmark. The museum was established in 1859 and is the oldest public art museum in Denmark outside Copenhagen. On 7 April 2004, ARoS Aarhus Kunstmuseum opened with exhibitions in a brand new modern building, 10 stories tall with a total floor area of 20,700 m² and designed by Danish architects Schmidt Hammer Lassen. Today, ARoS is one of the largest art museums in Northern Europe with a total of 980,909 visitors in 2017.

Apart from the large galleries with both permanent and changing exhibitions, the ARoS building features an arts shop, a dining café and a restaurant. The architectural vision of the museum was completed in 2011, with the addition of the circular skywalk Your rainbow panorama by Ólafur Elíasson. The installation has helped boost the museum's attendance, making it the second most visited museum in Denmark, just behind the well-known Louisiana Museum in Humlebæk.

Exhibitions
ARoS has a large art collection with works from the Danish Golden Age until today, a changing selection of which are on display in the museum halls. Alongside, themed and changing exhibitions of both Danish and international artists are presented, with former events featuring renowned artists such as Ólafur Elíasson, Bjørn Nørgaard, Ingvar Cronhammar, architect Frank Gehry, Paul McCarthy, Robert Rauschenberg, Michael Kvium, H.C. Andersen, Bill Viola and Wim Wenders. In the present building, the first themed exhibitions presented a series of main works by pop artists like Andy Warhol and Roy Lichtenstein. As many other modern art galleries and museums, ARoS also pays great tribute to architecture and architects, occasionally presenting architecture themes exhibitions.

Located in the basement is The 9 Spaces, a gallery with installation art from artist like James Turrell, Shirin Neshat and Olafur Eliasson. The number 9 refers to Dante Alighieri's The Divine Comedy and the 9 circles of hell. The rooms are painted black to contrast with the bright white exterior. The roof terrace substitutes for the divine light your enter from hell. This way the whole museum is part of the travel from hell to heaven. This movement emphasised by the grand spiral staircase in the main 'museum streetscape'.
The roof of the museum is dominated by the installation Your rainbow panorama by Ólafur Elíasson. This circular skywalk has windows in the colors of the rainbow thereby showing the panorama of Aarhus in different colors depending on location of the viewer. The installation cost DKK million 60 ($10.7 million) to construct and was sponsored by the Realdania foundation. It was inaugurated on May 28, 2011. A second section, a glass lounge that guides visitors from the main museum building to Your rainbow panorama and houses another site-specific work opened in 2013.

History 
The museum was established in 1859 and is the oldest public art museum in Denmark outside Copenhagen. The art collecting activities were initiated some years earlier in 1847 by the local art association of "Århus Kunstforening af 1847" and the first public exhibition was presented on 6 January 1859 in Aarhus' old Town Hall, located at the Cathedral, now housing the Women's Museum. The present building next to the Concert Halls is the fourth locality of the art museum and it opened here in 2004. 

On 6 January 2009, ARoS Aarhus Kunstmuseum celebrated its 150-year anniversary with a jubilee exhibition, displaying the same works as the very first exhibition in 1859, amongst others.

Future constructions 
In the fall of 2014, ARoS announced plans for an expansion with a new underground gallery and a new big installation to be made by American artist James Turrell. The project has the working title "The Next Level" and is planned to open in 2020.

Name 
The name ARoS refers to the Old Danish name of the city Aarhus, Áros, while the capitalized letters of the name hint at the Latin word for art, namely ars.

Attendance 
In 2010, before Eliasson's piece opened, ARoS received 221,744 visitors. Two years later, more than 551,000 visitors came to the museum. In 2017, 980,909 visitors was noted. These figure includes visitors who in one way or another have redeemed ticket (658,086) and people who have visited ARoS Shop, ART Café or gone through the building.

Gallery

References

Sources 
 Visit Aarhus describes AROS as Aarhus's main art museum
 Description of "Your rainbow panorama" by the Realdania foundation (in danish)
 description of "Your rainbow panorama" by designboom.com

External links

Official website
Article about the museum

Buildings and structures completed in 2004
Museums in Aarhus
Art museums and galleries in Denmark
Schmidt Hammer Lassen buildings
Art museums established in 1859
1859 establishments in Denmark
Museums in the Central Denmark Region
Tourist attractions in Aarhus
Skyscrapers in Denmark
Restaurants in Aarhus
Coffeehouses and cafés in Aarhus